Itambé is a municipality located in the state of Pernambuco, Brazil. Located  at 99 km away from Recife, capital of the state of Pernambuco. Has an estimated (IBGE 2020) population of 36,471 inhabitants. The community is split between the state of Pernambuco and the state of Paraíba

Geography
 State - Pernambuco
 Region - Zona da mata Pernambucana
 Boundaries - Paraiba state   (N);  Condado and Aliança   (S);  Goiana   (E); Camutanga and Ferreiros   (W)
 Area - 304.38 km2
 Elevation - 179 m
 Hydrography - Goiana River
 Vegetation - Subcaducifólia forest
 Climate - Hot tropical and humid
 Annual average temperature - 24.2 c
 Distance to Recife - 99 km

Economy
The main economic activities in Itambé are based in commerce and agribusiness, especially sugarcane (over 1,233,000 tons); and livestock such as cattle and poultry.

Economic indicators

Economy by Sector
2006

Health indicators

References

Municipalities in Pernambuco